Pedro Pinho Marques (born 18 March 1998) is a Portuguese professional footballer who plays for U.D. Oliveirense as a central defender.

Club career
Marques was born in Oliveira de Azeméis, Aveiro District. He finished his youth career with F.C. Paços de Ferreira, having signed at the age of 17.

On 10 January 2017, Marques made his professional debut with the first team, playing the entire 2–2 home draw against F.C. Vizela in the group stage of the Taça da Liga. He spent the 2018–19 and 2019–20 seasons on loan to SC Coimbrões and F.C. Felgueiras 1932, both clubs in the third division.

Marques appeared in his first Primeira Liga match with Paços on 4 April 2021, coming on as a late substitute in the 2–0 away loss to F.C. Famalicão. On 8 July 2021 he returned to the third tier, signing with S.C.U. Torreense.

References

External links

Portuguese League profile 

1998 births
Living people
People from Oliveira de Azeméis
Sportspeople from Aveiro District
Portuguese footballers
Association football defenders
Primeira Liga players
Liga Portugal 2 players
Campeonato de Portugal (league) players
U.D. Oliveirense players
FC Porto players
Padroense F.C. players
F.C. Paços de Ferreira players
F.C. Felgueiras 1932 players
S.C.U. Torreense players